Southington High School (previously  Lewis Academy and Lewis High School) is a public high school located at 720 Pleasant Street in Southington, Connecticut. 
It is the only high school in Southington.

History
Southington residents Sally Lewis and her cousin Adin Lewis left bequests to build the Lewis Academy, which when it opened in 1848 provided a classical education including "Latin, Greek, mathematics, geography, and other branches higher than are taught in the common school." In 1882 the Academy became Lewis High School and was acquired by the town of Southington, becoming a public school. In 1949, the one hundredth year of the school, the last class graduated. Lewis High School became Southington High School in 1950 when the new building opened.

Academics
Southington High School offers a hierarchical system with classes designed to suit student ability level. These courses are college prep (CP), competitive college prep (CCP), and honors-level (H) classes.

Faculty members are responsible for suggesting the most appropriate level of courses to individual students; however, students are allowed to enroll in courses of any difficulty level with the written permission of their parents and an individual meeting with the student's guidance counselor.

Southington High School offers a number of Advanced Placement courses as well as for-credit foreign language courses through the University of Connecticut's Early College Experience program. Some other courses, such as Accounting II, will also offer college credit if completed with an unweighted grade above 75.

Athletics

Southington competes in the West division of the Central Connecticut Conference, which consists of New Britain High School, Simsbury High School, Hall High School, Newington High School, Conard High School, Farmington High School, and Northwest Catholic High School.  Sports that are at Southington are:

 Soccer
 Football
 Volleyball
 Field Hockey (girls)
 Cross Country
 Track & Field
 Basketball
 Softball
 Baseball
 Tennis
 Swimming/Diving
 Lacrosse
Hockey
 Wrestling

Sports stadiums 
The largest stadium at Southington High School is Fontana Field.  Sports that are played at Fontana Field are: football, soccer, lacrosse, field hockey, and track & field. The SHS athletic complex contains two football fields, three soccer fields, two softball fields, two baseball fields, two field hockey fields, a lacrosse field, and tennis courts.  The volleyball and basketball teams play in one of the two gyms at SHS.

School news
The Emblem is Southington High School's student newspaper. First published in 1898, it has been continuously published since 1911.

PCB scare
In September of the 2000-2001 school year, the motor that runs the school's clocks exploded in the basement of Southington High School. Students were kept out of the building for days as everything was tested for cancerous PCBs.

Notable alumni
James R. Benn, author, best known for Billy Boyle book series
Tom Cichowski, professional football player with the Green Bay Packers 1967 and Denver Broncos 1967-1968
Rob Dibble, professional baseball player
John Krafcik, CEO of Waymo, LLC and former CEO of Hyundai Motor America
Carl Pavano, professional baseball player
Chris Petersen, professional baseball player
Mike Raczka, professional baseball player
Sal Romano, professional baseball player

References

External links
 

Buildings and structures in Southington, Connecticut
Schools in Hartford County, Connecticut
Public high schools in Connecticut